JabberMask is an under-development wearable computer face mask that uses LED lights to allow its wearer to smile in a manner, despite wearing a mask. The mask was developed by game developer Tyler Glaiel. An early un-named prototype version of the mask gained considerable attention online when revealed on Glaiel's personal Twitter account, and even WHO ended up listing it as a "COVID-19 innovation" on their website. Though he initially said he had no plans to sell it and recommended people making their own, the positive press led him to eventually take the project to Kickstarter where he was able to crowdfund over $70,000 to mass-produce it. The mask is powered by an Arduino computer.

References

American inventions
Kickstarter-funded products
Medical masks
Wearable computers